Exos may refer to:

EXOS, an athletics company
In video games, exos means powered exoskeletons
In medicine, exos is short for the exosome complex
Lotus Exos, see Lotus Cars
 "EXOS", a 2016 song by Blank Banshee from MEGA

Rockets
Exos Aerospace company
Mu (rocket family), the Japanese EXOS-A, B, C, and D
RM-86 Exos rockets circa 1960
The EXOS payload in the ExoCube (CP-10) satellite

Software
 EXOS (Excelan), a brand by network company Excelan
 EXOS, short for ExtremeXOS network operating system
 ExOS, short for Exokernel operating system kernel